The United States District Court for the District of New Jersey (in case citations, D.N.J.) is a federal court in the Third Circuit (except for patent claims and claims against the U.S. government under the Tucker Act, which are appealed to the Federal Circuit).

The Judiciary Act of 1789 established New Jersey as a single District on September 24, 1789.  On February 13, 1801 the Judiciary Act of 1801 reorganized the federal court system, resulting in the state being divided into Eastern and Western districts.  The Judiciary Act of 1801 was repealed on March 8, 1802 and New Jersey was re-established as a single district court.

The United States Attorney's Office for the District of New Jersey represents the United States in civil and criminal litigation in the court.  the United States Attorney for the District of New Jersey is Philip R. Sellinger.

Organization of the court 
The United States District Court for the District of New Jersey holds court at Mitchell H. Cohen Building & U.S. Courthouse in Camden, at Martin Luther King Building & U.S. Courthouse in Newark, and Clarkson S. Fisher Building & U.S. Courthouse in Trenton. 

 Camden Vicinage comprises Atlantic, Burlington, Camden, Cape May, Cumberland, Gloucester, and Salem counties.

 Newark Vicinage comprises Bergen, Essex, Hudson, Morris, Passaic, Sussex, and Union counties, and the northern part of Middlesex County.

 Trenton Vicinage comprises Hunterdon, Mercer, Monmouth, Ocean, Somerset, and Warren counties, and the southern part of Middlesex County.

Current judges 
:

Vacancies and pending nominations

Former judges

Chief judges

Succession of seats

List of U.S. Attorneys

See also 
 Courts of New Jersey
 List of current United States district judges
 List of United States federal courthouses in New Jersey

References

External links 
 United States District Court for the District of New Jersey Official Website
 United States Attorney for the District of New Jersey Official Website
 Thomas Library of Congress
 New Jersey Court

New Jersey law
New Jersey
Newark, New Jersey
Trenton, New Jersey
Camden, New Jersey
1789 establishments in New Jersey
Courts and tribunals established in 1789
1801 disestablishments in New Jersey
Courts and tribunals disestablished in 1801
1802 establishments in New Jersey
Courts and tribunals established in 1802